Massachusetts House of Representatives' 25th Middlesex district in the United States is one of 160 legislative districts included in the lower house of the Massachusetts General Court. It covers part of the city of Cambridge in Middlesex County. Democrat Marjorie Decker of Cambridge has represented the district since 2013.

The district geographic boundary overlaps with those of the Massachusetts Senate's 2nd Middlesex district, Middlesex and Suffolk district, and 1st Suffolk and Middlesex district.

Representatives
This is a partial list of Representatives:
 Henry Richardson, circa 1858 
 Nathan B. Edwards, circa 1859 
 Albert G. Thompson, circa 1888 
 Richard B. Coolidge, circa 1920 
 Arthur W. Robinson, circa 1920 
 James R. Doncaster, circa 1951 
 James S. Conway, circa 1975 
 Charles Flaherty, 1991–1996
 Alice Wolf, 1996–2013
 Marjorie Decker, 2013–

Former locales
The district previously covered:
 Billerica, circa 1872 
 Chelmsford, circa 1872 
 Tewksbury, circa 1872

See also
 List of Massachusetts House of Representatives elections
 List of Massachusetts General Courts
 List of former districts of the Massachusetts House of Representatives
 Other Middlesex County districts of the Massachusetts House of Representatives: 1st, 2nd, 3rd, 4th, 5th, 6th, 7th, 8th, 9th, 10th, 11th, 12th, 13th, 14th, 15th, 16th, 17th, 18th, 19th, 20th, 21st, 22nd, 23rd, 24th, 26th, 27th, 28th, 29th, 30th, 31st, 32nd, 33rd, 34th, 35th, 36th, 37th

Images
Portraits of legislators

References

External links
 Ballotpedia
  (State House district information based on U.S. Census Bureau's American Community Survey).

House
Government of Middlesex County, Massachusetts